The 2022 Asian Acrobatic Gymnastics Championships were the 12th edition of the Asian Acrobatic Gymnastics Championships, and were held in Pavlodar, Kazakhstan from September 23 to 28, 2022. The competition was approved by the International Gymnastics Federation.

Medal summary

Senior

Junior

Medal table

References

2022 in gymnastics
2022
International gymnastics competitions hosted by Kazakhstan
2022 in Kazakhstani sport
Asian Acrobatic Gymnastics Championships